The Fruita Schoolhouse is a historic school building located in Fruita, Utah, United States.

Description
The Behunin family, early settlers of the Capitol Reef area, donated the land in 1892. For over a decade the school had a dirt roof and in 1935 the bare walls were chinked in. Elijah Cutler Behunin donated the land for the school and his daughter, Nettie Behunin, was the school's first teacher. In 1895 the school became part of the Junction School Precinct and remained a functional grade school until 1941. From 1941 until its induction into the U.S. National Register of Historic Places in 1973, the building was unoccupied.

Images

See also

 National Register of Historic Places listings in Wayne County, Utah

References

External links

 

Buildings and structures in Wayne County, Utah
Defunct schools in Utah
One-room schoolhouses in Utah
School buildings completed in 1895
Schoolhouses in the United States
School buildings on the National Register of Historic Places in Utah
Historic American Buildings Survey in Utah
National Register of Historic Places in Wayne County, Utah
1896 establishments in Utah
Individually listed contributing properties to historic districts on the National Register in Utah
National Register of Historic Places in Capitol Reef National Park